The Helena Fire was a wildfire that burned in Trinity Alps Wilderness and west of the town of  Weaverville, Trinity County, California in the United States. The fire had burned , and destroyed 72 homes. The fire merged with the nearby Fork Fire. The Helena Fire was fully extinguished on November 15, after reaching . The cause of the fire was a tree falling into a power line. The fire threatened the communities of Weaverville and Junction City and impacted recreational activities in the area.

The fire

The Helena Fire was first reported on August 30, 2017, at 5:20 pm near the town of Helena, California, along California State Route 299. The cause of the fire was a tree falling into a power line. It was fueled by brush, timber and hardwood litter, with excessive heat helping to strengthen the fire.

On September 3, the fire was reported to be growing to the northeast and southwest, threatening infrastructure in Junction City, California. Crews constructed firelines from Junction City to Glennison Gap. The fire had expanded to Brock Gulch and along Brock Road. It had also expanded into the Trinity Alps Wilderness. 

As of the morning of September 4, the fire was burning along California State Route 299 and on both sides of the Trinity River. The fire had destroyed 72 homes and 61 outbuildings. The Helena Fire had burned  and was at 14% containment. That day, a spot fire broke out east of Weaver Bally Lookout. Trinity Alps Unified School District, Douglas City Elementary School District, and Klamath Trinity Joint Unified School District canceled school on September 5 due to unhealthy air conditions with schools resuming on September 11.

Heavy smoke has been identified as creating a challenge at determining the perimeter of the fire, which is currently burning near Junction City and Weaverville. The Helena Fire moved into the Miller Creek drainage on southern, southwest flank of the Trinity River. Containment lines from the 2008 Iron and Eagle Fires were being used to control the fire. 

On November 15, it was reported that the Helena Fire had been fully extinguished.

Evacuations and closures

Portions of the Shasta-Trinity National Forest are closed, including to hunters. Specifically those areas directly impacted by the fires. 

Bureau of Land Management's Junction City Campground, Bagdad River Access on Highway 299, Pigeon Campground, and the Grapevine Swimming Hole remain closed.

Impact

The smoke from the Helena Fire settled over Sacramento, California, creating unhealthy breathing conditions.

See also
2017 California wildfires

References

Wildfires in Trinity County, California
History of Trinity County, California
2017 California wildfires